Luke Barnatt (born 13 April 1988) is an English mixed martial artist, and entrepreneur, who fought as a Middleweight for the Ultimate Fighting Championship. He was a member of FX's The Ultimate Fighter: Team Jones vs. Team Sonnen, and has also competed for BAMMA, UCMMA and RXF. At 6' 6" Barnatt is one of the tallest fighters currently competing in his weight class. Barnatt received his nickname "Bigslow" from brothers John Maguire and Tommy Maguire, for his size and being slow in response to their jokes and insults. He is a close friend to the former four-time world kickboxing champion and internet celebrity Andrew Tate.

Background
Barnatt was born in Redbridge, Essex and moved to Islington at the age of one and then Chelmsford at the age of ten. At the age of 17, Barnatt would move to Peterborough. Barnatt began playing many sports from a young age, including basketball, cricket, and track and field. At the age of 15, Barnatt began training in Tae Kwon Do but only achieved the rank of yellow belt before giving it up. Later on, Barnatt was introduced to wrestling by professional mixed martial arts fighter Jack Mason at Tsunami Shooters MMA.

Mixed martial arts career

The Ultimate Fighter
Barnatt had a record of 5-0 before being selected as a member of The Ultimate Fighter: Team Jones vs. Team Sonnen In January 2013. Barnatt defeated Nicholas Kohring by decision to qualify the TUF house. During the choosing of teams, he was the first pick of Chael Sonnen of Team Sonnen and the first pick overall.

Barnatt defeated Gilbert Smith, Jr. in the preliminary round via second-round knockout, but was eliminated in the quarter-finals by Dylan Andrews.

Ultimate Fighting Championship
Barnatt made his UFC debut against fellow Ultimate Fighter castmate Collin Hart on 13 April 2013 at The Ultimate Fighter 17 Finale. He won the fight via unanimous decision.

Barnatt faced Andrew Craig on 26 October 2013  at UFC Fight Night: Machida vs. Munoz.  He won the fight via submission in the second round.  The fight also earned Barnatt his first Fight of the Night bonus award.

Barnatt faced promotional newcomer Mats Nilsson at UFC Fight Night 37. He won the fight via TKO due to strikes in the first round.

Barnatt faced Sean Strickland on 31 May 2014 at UFC Fight Night 41. Barnatt lost the fight by a split decision.

Barnatt faced Roger Narvaez on 22 November 2014 at UFC Fight Night 57. He lost the fight via split decision.

Barnatt was expected to face Clint Hester on 4 April 2015 at UFC Fight Night 63. However, Hester pulled out of the fight in early March due to a broken foot.  Subsequently, Barnatt was pulled from the card entirely in favor of a matchup with Mark Muñoz on 16 May 2015  at UFC Fight Night 66. He lost the fight by unanimous decision and was subsequently released from the promotion.

Post-UFC; Independent promotions
Barnatt fought for Italian promotion Venator FC against Mattia Schiavolin on 12 December 2015 at Venator FC 2 in a fight for the promotions middleweight championship. He took the title by winning the fight by submission due to a rear-naked choke in the fourth round.

He was expected to face Rafael Silva on 20 February 2016 at British Challenge MMA 14. However his opponent was later changes to be Charles Andrade. He won the fight by knockout after dropping his opponent to the canvas with a right hand, 11 seconds into round 3.

Barnatt was expected to defend his Venator middleweight championship against fellow UFC veteran Jason Miller on 21 May 2016 at Venator FC 3. However, Miller missed weight by an amount of 24 lbs, as a result of this Miller was removed from the matchup against Barnatt and replaced by Stefan Croitoru. Barnatt won the fight, and defended the title, by TKO in round 2.

He fought Cristian Mitrea, in a light heavyweight match-up, on 19 December 2016 at RXF 25: All Stars in Romania. After stunning his opponent by punches and knees up against the fence, Barnatt landed a head kick to earn the knockout victory, 3 minutes into the first round.

Absolute Championship Berkut
Barnatt faced Mamed Khalidov on 11 March 2017 at ACB 53. He lost the fight via knockout in the first round.

Championships and accomplishments
Ultimate Fighting Championship
Fight of the Night (One time) 
Venator FC
VFC Middleweight Championship (One time)
One successful title defense

Mixed martial arts record

|-
| Loss
| align=center|15–10
|  Evgeniy Egemberdiev
| KO (punch)
| ACA 115: Ismailov vs. Shtyrkov
| 
| align=center|1
| align=center|3:46
| Moscow, Russia
|
|-
| Loss
| align=center|15–9
|  Karol Celiński
| Decision (unanimous)
| ACA 109: Strus vs. Haratyk
| 
| align=center|3
| align=center|5:00
| Łódź, Poland
| 
|-
|Loss
|align=center|15–8
|Cory Hendricks
|Submission (rear-naked choke)
|ACA 102: Tumenov vs. Ushukov
|
|align=center|2
|align=center|4:16
|Almaty, Kazakhstan
|
|-
|Win
|align=center|15–7
|Karol Celiński
|KO (punch)
|ACA 96: Goncharov vs. Johnson
|
|align=center|1
|align=center|1:29
|Łódź, Poland
|  
|-
|Loss
|align=center|14–7
|Jorge Gonzalez
|KO (punches)
|ACA 92: Yagshimuradov vs. Celiński
|
|align=center|1
|align=center|3:05
|Warsaw,  Poland
|
|-
|Loss
|align=center|14–6
|Karol Celiński
|Decision (majority)
|ACB 88: Barnatt vs. Celiński
|
|align=center|3
|align=center|5:00
|Brisbane, Australia
|
|-
|Win
|align=center|14–5
|Maxim Futin
|TKO (knees and punches)
| |ACB 81: Saidov vs. Carneiro
|
|align=center|2
|align=center|3:27
|Dubai, United Arab Emirates
|
|-
|Loss
|align=center| 13–5
|Scott Askham
| Decision (split)
| ACB 70: The Battle of Britain
|
|align=center| 3
|align=center| 5:00
|Sheffield, England
|
|-
|Win
|align=center|13–4
|Max Nunes
|KO (punch)
| |ACB 63: Celiński vs. Magalhaes
|
|align=center|1
|align=center|4:08
|Gdańsk, Poland
|
|-
|-
|Loss
|align=center|12–4
|Mamed Khalidov
|KO (punches)
| |ACB 54: Supersonic
|
|align=center|1
|align=center|0:21
|Manchester, England
|
|-
|Win
|align=center|12–3
|Cristian Mitrea
|KO (head kick)
|RXF 25: All Stars
|
|align=center|1
|align=center|3:00
|Ploiești, Romania
|
|-
|Win
|align=center|11–3
|Stefan Croitoru
|TKO (knees and punches)
|Venator FC 3
|
|align=center|2
|align=center|2:32
|Milan, Italy
|
|-
|Win
|align=center|10–3
|Charles Andrade
|KO (punch)
|British Challenge MMA 14
|
|align=center|3
|align=center|0:11
|Colchester, England
|
|-
|Win
|align=center|9–3
|Mattia Schiavolin
|Submission (rear-naked choke)
|Venator FC 2
|
|align=center|4
|align=center|1:46
|Rimini, Italy
|
|-
|Loss
|align=center|8–3
|Mark Muñoz
|Decision (unanimous)
|UFC Fight Night: Edgar vs. Faber
|
|align=center|3
|align=center|5:00
|Pasay, Philippines
|
|-
|Loss
|align=center|8–2
|Roger Narvaez
|Decision (split)
|UFC Fight Night: Edgar vs. Swanson
|
|align=center|3
|align=center|5:00
|Austin, Texas, United States
|
|-
|Loss
|align=center| 8–1
|Sean Strickland
|Decision (split)
|UFC Fight Night: Munoz vs. Mousasi
|
|align=center|3
|align=center|5:00
|Berlin, Germany
|
|-
|Win
|align=center| 8–0
|Mats Nilsson
|TKO (head kick and punches)
|UFC Fight Night: Gustafsson vs. Manuwa
|
|align=center|1
|align=center|4:24
|London, England
|
|-
|Win
|align=center| 7–0
|Andrew Craig
|Submission (rear-naked choke)
|UFC Fight Night: Machida vs. Munoz
|
|align=center|2
|align=center|2:12
|Manchester, England
|
|-
|Win
|align=center| 6–0
|Collin Hart
|Decision (unanimous)
|The Ultimate Fighter: Team Jones vs. Team Sonnen Finale
|
|align=center|3
|align=center|5:00
|Las Vegas, Nevada, United States
|
|-
|Win
|align=center| 5–0
|Matteo Piran
|TKO (punches)
|Ultimate Warrior Challenge 20
|
|align=center|1
|align=center|4:17
|Southend-on-Sea, England
|
|-
|Win
|align=center| 4–0
|Chris Harman
|Submission (rear-naked choke)
|UCMMA 28
|
|align=center|1
|align=center|3:43
|London, England
|
|-
|Win
|align=center| 3–0
|Lee Johnson
|Submission (rear-naked choke)
|BAMMA 9
|
|align=center|1
|align=center|2:36
|Birmingham, England
|
|-
|Win
|align=center| 2–0
|Ben Callum
|Decision (unanimous)
|UCMMA 26
|
|align=center|3
|align=center|5:00
|London, England
|
|-
|Win
|align=center| 1–0
|Chris Greig
|TKO (punches)
|Cage Fighters Championship
|
|align=center|2
|align=center|2:11
|Brentwood, England
|
|-

Mixed martial arts exhibition record

|-
|Loss
|align=center|2-1
| Dylan Andrews
| TKO (punches)
| The Ultimate Fighter: Team Jones vs. Team Sonnen
| (airdate)
|align=center|3
|align=center|1:57
|Las Vegas, Nevada, United States
|
|-
|Win
|align=center|2-0
| Gilbert Smith
| KO (flying knee)
| The Ultimate Fighter: Team Jones vs. Team Sonnen
| (airdate)
|align=center|2
|align=center|3:14
|Las Vegas, Nevada, United States
|
|-
|Win
|align=center|1–0
| Nicholas Kohring
| Decision (unanimous) 
| The Ultimate Fighter: Team Jones vs. Team Sonnen
| (airdate)
|align=center|2
|align=center|5:00
|Las Vegas, Nevada, United States
|
|-

See also
 List of male mixed martial artists

References

External links
 
 
 Luke Barnatt - UFC Fans

1988 births
Living people
Middleweight mixed martial artists
Sportspeople from Cambridge
English male mixed martial artists
Mixed martial artists utilizing taekwondo
Mixed martial artists utilizing wrestling
Mixed martial artists utilizing Brazilian jiu-jitsu
English male taekwondo practitioners
English practitioners of Brazilian jiu-jitsu
Ultimate Fighting Championship male fighters